Zelyonaya Roshcha is a rural locality (a village) in Zlynkovsky District, Bryansk Oblast, Russia. The population was 26 as of 2010. There is 1 street.

Geography 
Zelyonaya Roshcha is located 27 km southeast of Zlynka (the district's administrative centre) by road. Malye Shcherbinichi is the nearest rural locality.

References 

Rural localities in Zlynkovsky District